"Molly" is a song by French-American DJ Cedric Gervais, first announced by Gervais through his YouTube channel on 9 April 2012. The song was released as a single in the United States and Canada on 3 July 2012 through Big Beat Records, and as an EP in the United Kingdom on 22 July, and then worldwide on 21 August 2012 through Spinnin' Records and 3 Beat Productions, including remixes. It was written and produced by Cedric Gervais and Carlos Cid. The song was used in the 2013 film Pain & Gain.

"Molly" was heavily sampled in American recording artist Tyga's 2013 song of the same name. It was released as a promotional single for his third studio album Hotel California.

Controversy
American singer Madonna infamously referenced the song while promoting her song "Girl Gone Wild". Her mention caused great controversy, inciting criticism from electronic dance music producer deadmau5. The term 'Molly' is a reference to the dance drug MDMA.

Music video
A music video to accompany the release of "Molly" was first released onto YouTube on 2 April 2012 at a total length of four minutes and nine seconds.

Track listings

Charts

Release history

References

2012 singles
2012 songs
Cedric Gervais songs